Kmkadzor or Migrelalay is a village that is, de facto, in the Martakert Province of the breakaway Republic of Artsakh; de jure it is in the Tartar District of Azerbaijan, in the disputed region of Nagorno-Karabakh. The village has an ethnic Armenian-majority population, and also had an Armenian majority in 1989.

Toponymy 
The village was known as Mingrelsk during the Soviet period.

History 
During the Soviet period, the village was part of the Mardakert District of the Nagorno-Karabakh Autonomous Oblast.

Economy and culture 
The population is mainly engaged in agriculture, animal husbandry, and mining. The village is part of the community of Maghavuz.

Demographics 
The village had 75 inhabitants in 2005, and 116 inhabitants in 2015.

References

External links 
 

Populated places in Martakert Province
Populated places in Tartar District